Vladeck Houses is a public housing development built and maintained by the New York City Housing Authority on the Lower East Side of Manhattan.

Background
The development is named after Baruch Charney Vladeck (1886–1938), who was general manager of The Jewish Daily Forward, a Yiddish language newspaper, helped found the Jewish Labor Committee in 1934, served as its first president, and was a member of the original board of the New York City Housing Authority.

This complex is bordered by Madison Street to its north, Water Street to its south, Gouverneur Street to its west, and Jackson Street to its east. Construction began September 10, 1939, and was finished November 20, 1940.

This complex is bordered by Madison Street to its north, Cherry Street to its south, and Jackson Street to its west. Construction began September 10, 1939, and was finished October 25, 1940.

No one is currently serving as the Resident Association President for Vladeck Houses.

Since it is on the Lower East Side, Vladeck Houses is serviced by the New York Police Department's PSA 4 and is governed by Manhattan Community Board 3.

References

Public housing in Manhattan
Residential buildings completed in 1940
Lower East Side
Residential buildings in Manhattan